Cyon is LG Electronics' Korean mobile phone brand. LG established the brand in 1997. Like all other mobile phone brands in Korea, they feature the latest technologies such as cameras, Internet access, and TV through IP.

Origin of the name
From the original "Hwatong(화통)" it is renamed several times, into "Freeway" and then "CiON" or "CION", meaning a descendant of a noble blood. And then it is respelled into "CyON", and later to "CYON". When it was being respelled into CyON, it is said that the name was loosely derived from "cyber-on", implying connectivity to the "cyberspace"(or "cybernetic space"), where, in turn, "cyber-" and  "cybernetics" find its etymology in Greek κυβερνήτης(steersman, skipper, guide, governor).

See also
 SK Telecom
 KTF
 LG Telecom
 Anycall
 SK Teletech
 Motorola
 Pantech Curitel
 VK Mobile
 KTF Ever
 Korean Wave

External links
 LG Electronics Homepage of Cyon Division
 Cyon Homepage
 Cyon Tphone 
 Black Label No. 1 - Chocolate

References

LG Electronics
Mobile phone manufacturers
South Korean brands
Companies established in 1997